Ernst Heinrich Hoppenberg (26 July 1878 in Bremen – 29 September 1937 in Kirn) was a German swimmer and water polo player who competed in the late 19th century and early 20th century in the 200 metre events. He participated in Swimming at the 1900 Summer Olympics in Paris and won two gold medals in the 200 metre backstroke and 200 m team race for Germany.

He was also a member of the German water polo team but he did not participate in the only match for Germany in the 1900 tournament. He died in a traffic accident.

See also
 List of members of the International Swimming Hall of Fame

References

External links

1878 births
1937 deaths
Sportspeople from Bremen
German male backstroke swimmers
Olympic gold medalists for Germany
Olympic swimmers of Germany
Olympic water polo players of Germany
Swimmers at the 1900 Summer Olympics
Water polo players at the 1900 Summer Olympics
Road incident deaths in Germany
Medalists at the 1900 Summer Olympics
Olympic gold medalists in swimming
German male water polo players
German male freestyle swimmers